{{DISPLAYTITLE:Muscarinic acetylcholine receptor M2}}

The muscarinic acetylcholine receptor M2, also known as the cholinergic receptor, muscarinic 2, is a muscarinic acetylcholine receptor that in humans is encoded by the CHRM2 gene. Multiple alternatively spliced transcript variants have been described for this gene.

Function

Heart 

The M2 muscarinic receptors are located in the heart, where they act to slow the heart rate down to normal sinus rhythm after negative stimulatory actions of the parasympathetic nervous system, by slowing the speed of depolarization. They also reduce contractile forces of the atrial cardiac muscle, and reduce conduction velocity of the atrioventricular node (AV node). However, they have little effect on the contractile forces of the ventricular muscle, slightly decreasing force.

IQ 

A Dutch family study found that there is "a highly significant association" between the CHRM2 gene and intelligence as measured by the Wechsler Adult Intelligence Scale-Revised. A similar association was found independently in the Minnesota Twin and Family Study.

However, a larger 2009 study attempting to replicate this claim instead found no significant association between the CHRM2 gene and intelligence.

Olfactory behavior 
Mediating olfactory guided behaviors (e.g. odor discrimination, aggression, mating).

Mechanism of action 

M2 muscarinic receptors act via a Gi type receptor, which causes a decrease in cAMP in the cell, generally leading to inhibitory-type effects. They appear to serve as autoreceptors.

In addition, they modulate G protein-coupled inwardly-rectifying potassium channels. In the heart, this contributes to a decreased heart rate. They do so by the Gβγ subunit of the G protein; Gβγ shifts the open probability of K+ channels in the membrane of the cardiac pacemaker cells, which causes an outward current of potassium, effectively hyperpolarizing the membrane, which slows down the heart rate.

Ligands
Few highly selective M2 agonists are available at present, although there are several non-selective muscarinic agonists that stimulate M2, and a number of selective M2 antagonists are available.

Agonists
 (2S,2'R,3'S,5'R)-1-methyl-2-(2-methyl-1,3-oxathiolan-5-yl)pyrrolidine 3-sulfoxide methyl iodide (selective for M2 but only partial agonist)
 Berberine
 Iper-8-Naph (alias N-8-Iper, bitopic/dualsteric agonist)
 Methacholine
 PAI (photoswitchable agonist)

Antagonists
 AFDX-384
Atropine
Chlorpromazine
Dicycloverine
Dimenhydrinate
 Dimethindene
Diphenhydramine
Gallamine
Hyoscyamine
Ipratropium
Methoctramine
 Otenzepad
Oxybutynin
Thorazine
Tolterodine
Trimipramine

See also 
 Muscarinic acetylcholine receptor

References

Further reading

External links 
 
 
 

Muscarinic acetylcholine receptors